Claud Clarence "Bob" Linton (April 18, 1902 – April 3, 1980) was a Major League Baseball catcher who appeared in 17 games with the 1929 Pittsburgh Pirates.

External links

 

1902 births
1980 deaths
Pittsburgh Pirates players
Louisiana Tech Bulldogs baseball players
Wyoming Cowboys baseball players
Columbia Comers players
Decatur Commodores players
Baltimore Orioles (IL) players
New Haven Profs players
Wilkes-Barre Barons (baseball) players
Hazleton Mountaineers players
York White Roses players
Galveston Buccaneers players
Toledo Mud Hens players
Fort Worth Cats players
Minneapolis Millers (baseball) players
Landis Millers players